John Beaumont, 4th Baron Beaumont KG (1361–1396) was an English military commander and Admiral who served in the Hundred Years' War against the partisans of Antipope Clement VII.

Origins
Beaumont was born in 1361 at Folkingham Castle, Lincolnshire, the only son of Henry Beaumont, 3rd Baron Beaumont (1340–1369), by his wife Margaret, daughter of John de Vere, 7th Earl of Oxford, by his wife Maud de Badlesmere. His paternal grandparents were John Beaumont, 2nd Baron Beaumont (aft. 1317–1342) and Eleanor of Lancaster (1318–1372), the fifth daughter of Henry, 3rd Earl of Lancaster (c. 1281–1345).

Career
He was knighted by King Edward III. He served in the French wars and against the partisans of Pope Clement VII.  He accompanied John of Gaunt to Spain in the attempted conquest of Castile in 1386. He tilted against the Great Chamberlain of France in a tournament at Calais in 1388.  In 1390 he tilted with the famous Boucicaut at St. Inghelbert. He was appointed Admiral of the North from 20 May 1388 – 22 June 1389 jointly with Sir John Roches.  From 23 June 1389 until 22 March 1390, Admiral Lord Beaumont held the office solely.  In 1389 he was briefly Warden of the West Marches towards Scotland. In 1392 he was appointed Constable of Dover Castle and Lord Warden of the Cinque Ports.  In 1393 he was created a Knight of the Garter and was one of the Ambassadors to France to demand Princess Isabella in marriage for King Richard II.

Marriage

In 1389 he married Katherine Everingham (1367–1426/8), daughter and heiress of Sir Thomas Everingham, Knt. of Laxton, Nottinghamshire. They had the five children:
Henry Beaumont, 5th Baron Beaumont (d.1413), eldest son and heir, who married Elizabeth Willoughby, daughter of William Willoughby, 5th Baron Willoughby de Eresby (c.1370–1409), by whom he had issue John Beaumont, 1st Viscount Beaumont KG, the first ever viscount created in England.
Richard Beaumont, 2nd son.
Sir Thomas Beaumont, Lord of Bacqueville in France, 3rd son, who married Philippa Marward, daughter of Thomas Marward of Quartermarshe, Leicestershire. From this union descended the Beaumonts of Gracedieu in Leicestershire, the Beaumonts of Gittisham, near Honiton in Devon (inherited "for the sake of the name" from the also ancient but unrelated family of Beaumont of Shirwell in North Devon) and the Beaumonts of Coleorton in Leicestershire, which latter were the ancestors of the Beaumont baronets.
Eleanora Beaumont, a nun at Amesbury Abbey.
Elizabeth (or Cecilia) Beaumont, married, as his first wife, William de Botreaux, 3rd Baron Botreaux(1389–1462), whose sole heiress was his daughter Margaret Botreaux who married Robert Hungerford, 2nd Baron Hungerford.

References

Beaumont, John Beaumont, 4th Baron
Beaumont, John Beaumont, 4th Baron
Beaumont, John Beaumont, 4th Baron
Beaumont, John Beaumont, 4th Baron
Barons Beaumont
English admirals
14th-century English Navy personnel
Military personnel from Lincolnshire